The song "Azure Moon" is Every Little Thing's 29th single released by the Avex Trax label. "Azure Moon" was a ballad single that also included a special acoustic version of their 2004 single "Soraai" for Every Little Thing's concert "Every Little Thing X'mas Acoustic Live at Uragami Tenshudou: Ai no Uta", which took place at Nagasaki on December 11, 2005. The single peaked in 12th place on its first week at the charts and sold 17,212 copies.

Track listing
Azure Moon (Words - Kaori Mochida / music - HIKARI)
 (20051211 version) (Words - Kaori Mochida / music - HIKARI)
Azure Moon (Instrumental)

Charts
Oricon Sales Chart (Japan)

External links
 "Azure Moon" information at Avex Network.
 "Azure Moon" information at Oricon.

Every Little Thing (band) songs
2006 singles
Songs written by Kaori Mochida
Avex Trax singles
2006 songs